This article show all participating team squads at the 2011 FIVB World Grand Prix, played by sixteen countries with the final round held in Macau, China.

The following is the Argentina roster in the 2011 FIVB World Grand Prix.

The following is the Brazil roster in the 2011 FIVB World Grand Prix.

The following is the China roster in the 2011 FIVB World Grand Prix.

The following is the Cuba roster in the 2011 FIVB World Grand Prix.

The following is the Dominican Republic roster in the 2011 FIVB World Grand Prix.

The following is the Germany roster in the 2011 FIVB World Grand Prix.

The following is the Italy roster in the 2011 FIVB World Grand Prix.

The following is the Japan roster in the 2011 FIVB World Grand Prix.

The following is the Kazakhstan roster in the 2011 FIVB World Grand Prix.

The following is the South Korea roster in the 2011 FIVB World Grand Prix.

The following is the Peru roster in the 2011 FIVB World Grand Prix.

The following is the Poland roster in the 2011 FIVB World Grand Prix.

The following is the Russia roster in the 2011 FIVB World Grand Prix.

The following is the Serbia roster in the 2011 FIVB World Grand Prix.

The following is the Thailand roster in the 2011 FIVB World Grand Prix.

The following is the United States roster in the 2011 FIVB World Grand Prix.

References

External links
FIVB

2011
2011 in volleyball